Daria Gavrilova was the defending champion, but lost to Victoria Duval in the second round.

Unseeded Grace Min defeated first seed Caroline Garcia in the final 7–5, 7–6(7–3) to win the tournament.

Seeds

Main draw

Finals

Top half

Section 1

Section 2

Bottom half

Section 3

Section 4

References 
 Main draw

2011 US Open (tennis)
US Open, 2011 Girls' Singles